Pot Kettle Black may refer to:

 The phrase The pot calling the kettle black
 A song on the Wilco album Yankee Hotel Foxtrot